Campynemataceae (Campynemaceae) is a family of flowering plants. The family consists of two genera and four species of perennial herbaceous plants endemic to New Caledonia and Tasmania.

Taxonomy
Originally described by Dumortier in 1829, Campynemaceae consisted of a single genus, Campynema, described by Labillardière in Tasmania in 1804. In 1893 Baillon identified a closely related genus, Campynemanthe in New Caledonia. Together the two genera make up the family Campynemataceae sensu Angiosperm Phylogeny Group (APG), within the Liliales order.

While historically, the two genera have generally been treated together, their circumscription has varied considerably. The third edition (1903) of Engler's Syllabus only included Campynema, but positioned it as Campynematoideae, a subfamily of Amaryllidaceae.

Phylogeny

The synthesis of molecular data with cladistic analysis suggests that the Liliales form one of eleven orders of monocotyledons. Sequencing of the rbcL and trnL-F plastid genes revealed four main Liliales lineages:
 Liliaceae group: Liliaceae (including some former Uvulariaceae and Calochortaceae), Philesiaceae and Smilacaceae;
 Campynemataceae;
 Colchicaceae group (Colchicoid lilies): Colchicaceae (including Petermannia and Uvularia), Alstroemeriaceae and Luzuriaga;
 Melanthiaceae (including Trilliaceae).

This suggested that the Campynemataceae form one of seven families within the Liliales order.

References

Bibliography

  Additional excerpts
 
, in 
 
 
 
 
 
 
  In 
  In 
 
  Excerpts

External links

Campynemataceae in L. Watson and M.J. Dallwitz (1992 onwards). The families of flowering plants: descriptions, illustrations, identification, information retrieval. Version: 9 March 2006. https://web.archive.org/web/20070103200438/http://delta-intkey.com/ 
NCBI Taxonomy Browser

Liliales families
Liliales